FlowerChecker is a European company based in Brno, Czech Republic focused on plant identification. In addition to plants, FlowerChecker also focuses on the identification of mosses, lichens, and fungi. It was founded in 2014 by Ondřej Veselý, Jiří Řihák, and Ondřej Vild, at the time Ph.D. students.

Features & Tools 
FlowerChecker offers two different solutions - FlowerChecker mobile app and Plant.id API.

The FlowerChecker app was launched in April 2014 for Android and later that year for iOS. It requires users to submit photographs of the object they want to identify. The photographs are then examined by an international team of experts from the field of botany and horticulture.

Plant.id is a machine learning-based plant identification API launched in 2018, with the plant diseases identification API - Plant.id Health Assessment released in April 2022. The Plant.id API is suitable for integration into other software such as mobile apps.

Recognition 
In 2019, FlowerChecker won the Idea of the Year award in the AI Awards organized by the Confederation of Industry of the Czech Republic. In 2020, an academic study comparing ten free automated image recognition apps showed that the Plant.id’s performance excelled in the most of the studied parameters. In an independent study comparing different image-based species recognition models and their suitability for recognizing invasive alien species, the Plant.id API achieved the highest accuracy compared to other plant species recognition tools.

Research activities 
Flowerchecker cooperates with the Nature Conservation Agency of the Czech Republic on a biodiversity mapping project.

References

Applied machine learning
Czech companies established in 2014
Software companies of the Czech Republic